The Nissan NV200 is a light commercial and leisure activity, 4/5-door van designed and produced by the Japanese automaker Nissan since 2009.

Overview
The vehicle was previewed as the NV200 Concept at the 2007 Tokyo Motor Show, followed by the 2008 Nissan Tenjin Motor Show. The concept vehicle was equipped with a remote control panel for a spider camera, and equipment for organizing and editing photographs and images on the move.

The vehicle was unveiled at the 2009 Geneva Motor Show, followed by 2010 Beijing International Automobile Exhibition. The vehicle went on sale in Japan before summer 2009, followed by Europe in autumn 2009 and then in China and other markets. Available in combi and passenger car versions, NV200 was built on a modified version of Nissan's B platform, with fully independent strut type front suspension mounted on a separate subframe and a leaf spring rear axle.

Markets

Japan 
Available in Van DX light commercial van and Wagon 16S people carrier, the NV200 Vanette is a version of the Nissan NV200 van replacing the older Nissan Vanette.

The vehicle went on sale on 21 May 2009 in Japan, followed by other markets around the world.

Early Japanese models included Van DX (2/5-person), Van DX route van (2-person), Van GX (5-person), Wagon 16S (7-person).

Mitsubishi Delica D:3 and Delica Van (2011–2019) 
Badge engineered versions of the NV200 was sold in Japan by Mitsubishi Motors as the Mitsubishi Delica D:3 and Delica Van. It is equipped with a 1.6-liter straight-four engine. Both models went on sale in Japan in October 2011. Early Delica D:3 models include the M (5-seater) and G (7-seater). Introductory Delica Van models include DX (2/5-person) (5MT/4AT), GX (2/5-person) (4AT).

The Delica D:3 and Delica Van were discontinued in April 2019.

North America

The Nissan NV200 began production at Nissan Mexicana's Cuernevaca Assembly plant in 2013 for the North American market. By 2020, Nissan had captured only a small fraction of the commercial van market in America, and announced shortly afterward that NV200 production for North America would end in summer 2021.

NV200 New York City taxi 

The prototype version of the NV200 New York taxi vehicle was unveiled in 2011 Nissan Taxi of Tomorrow Design Expo, followed by 2012 New York International Auto Show, Nissan's Yokohama headquarters, and 2012 Paris Motor Show.

It is equipped with a 2.0-litre 4-cylinder engine, a low-annoyance horn with exterior lights that indicate when the vehicle is honking, sliding doors with entry step and grab handles, transparent roof panel (with shade), independently controlled rear air conditioning with a grape phenol-coated air filter, breathable, antimicrobial, environmentally friendly and easy-to-clean seat fabric that simulates the look and feel of leather; overhead reading lights for passengers and floor lighting to help locate belongings, a mobile charging station for passengers that includes a 12V electrical outlet and two USB plugs, a six-way adjustable driver's seat that features both recline and lumbar adjustments, even with a partition installed; standard driver's navigation and telematics systems; front and rear-seat occupant curtain airbags, as well as seat-mounted airbags for the front row; standard traction control and Vehicle Dynamic Control (VDC), lights that alert other road users that taxi doors are opening.

The production model was unveiled at the 2013 Matsuya Ginza's 'New York Week' fair, and went on sale as 2014 model year vehicle. The Nissan NV200 New York City taxi was built in North America at Nissan's facility in Cuernavaca, Mexico.

The vehicle entered the New York City's taxi fleet near the end of October 2013. The first buyer of Nissan NV200 New York City taxi was medallion number 7F20 owner Ranjit Singh, with delivery of taxi from Koeppel Nissan in Queens on 2013-10-18, and first 1-passenger fare service performed from JFK International Airport on 2013-10-23 to near 13th Street and 6th Avenue in Manhattan.

New York Supreme Court Justice Peter Moulton ruled that the deal between NYC and Nissan was "null, void and unenforceable" since the NV200 is not a hybrid vehicle. In addition, Manhattan Supreme Court Justice Schlomo Hagler ruled the New York City Taxi and Limousine Commission exceeded its authority for mandating the city's taxi fleets be replaced by Nissan NV200.  That ruling was overturned by a New York appeals court on 10 June 2014, with Justice David B. Saxe finding that the commission's mandate was in fact legal.

As of 16 December 2013, Nissan was in the process of distributing the first 200 units of NV200 New York City taxi to dealers across New York City. The company is also delivering another couple hundred new taxis to dealers in Seattle, Los Angeles, Salt Lake City and Texas.

A version of NV200 New York City taxi with rear ramp for wheelchair access, integrated restraint system for securing of wheelchairs was unveiled at the 2012 New York International Auto Show as the NV200 Mobility Taxi. The conversion of the NV200 Mobility Taxi was done by Indiana-based BraunAbility.

NV200 Compact Cargo Van 
The NV200 Compact Cargo Van was unveiled at the 2012 Chicago Auto Show. US models went on sale at Nissan Commercial Vehicle dealers beginning in early 2013 as 2013 model year vehicles. Early models include a 2.0-liter 16-valve 4-cylinder engine and Xtronic CVT. The 2014 model year vehicle went on sale in January 2014. The introductory lineup consisted of the S and SV models.

Europe 
Sales of European models of NV200 van and combi began from October 2009 in most European markets, followed by Family version in 2010. Early models include 1.6-litre HR16 (108PS) petrol or 1.5 dCi (K9K) 1,461cc (86PS) diesel engines, five-speed manual transmission, optional rear view parking camera. European models of NV200 were produced in Japan, until production started at Nissan's plant in Barcelona in November 2009.

As of 1 February 2019, Nissan has discontinued the diesel NV200 in Europe; replacing the model with the NV250, a rebadged Renault Kangoo. The last batch of diesel NV200 was manufactured in mid 2019 and sale of this model was discontinued by early 2020.

London, England taxi
In 2011, Nissan approached both Transport for London (TfL) and the Licensed Taxi Drivers Association to adapt a version of the NV200 to the requirements of the streets of London. With experience from supplying engines to London Taxis International for their Coventry-built TX1, the NV200 London Taxi was developed in London by Nissan Design Europe at their offices in Paddington. The Coventry-based ADV Manufacturing Ltd was responsible for the engineering, development and final assembly of Nissan NV200 London Taxi.

The prototype vehicle, equipped with the standard Renault 1461cc (89/110PS) dCi (K9K) turbodiesel engine, 5-speed manual (89PS) or 6-speed manual (110PS) transmission was unveiled in London, followed by 2012 Paris Motor Show.

After feedback, and to meet new stricter European emissions legislation, Nissan offered production versions from January 2014 based on a 1.6-litre petrol engine and automatic transmission. The new Spanish-built NV200 London Taxi was launched in January 2014, to be followed by a battery-electric London Taxi based on the e-NV200 in 2015.

The entire London Taxi project was shelved later in 2014. A revised proposal was announced in 2017, which would come to fruition if the British Government approved electrification of the London Taxi network.

China 
In China, the NV200 is built by Nissan in partnership with Dongfeng Motor, and was released in June 2010. Early models include HR16 DOHC (83 kW/150 Nm) engine. The Chinese market NV200 was refreshed in February 2014 with V-Motion grille, adding a new Luxury variant with redesigned three-bar grille, redesigned bumper and two-tone alloy wheels.

India 
The Evalia was launched in India in September 2012. It was offered in a total of four variants – the base XE, XE Plus, XL and the top end XV with a 1.5-liter dCi diesel engine paired to a 5-speed manual transmission. In June 2015, Nissan stopped production of the vehicle due to low demand, with 2,412 units sold since its launch.

Ashok Leyland STiLE 

A badge engineered version of the NV200 went on sale as the Ashok Leyland STiLE since September 2013. Early models included 1.5-litre K9K (86PS) engine, 5-speed manual transmission. It was withdrawn from sale during 2015 due to low sales.

Indonesia 
The Evalia was launched in Indonesia on 7 June 2012. It was initially available in three grade levels: S, SV and XV. The Evalia received an update on 23 January 2014 and is offered in three grade levels: St, SV and XV Highway Star. The Evalia was discontinued in the country in 2016, with a few units sold in early 2017.

Nissan e-NV200 

The e-NV200 is the battery-electric version of the NV200 panel van. Nissan introduced the concept version of the e-NV200 at the 2012 North American International Auto Show in Detroit.

Trials with a prototype were conducted with Japan Post Service beginning in July 2011, followed by trials with FedEx in London starting in December 2011, AEON Retail Co., Ltd., FedEx Express in Yokohama Area, Tochigi prefectural government in prefecture's rural areas from 3 September 2012.

More testing with a more advanced pre-production version, unveiled at the 64th IAA Commercial Vehicle International Motor Show in Hanover, took place in Singapore, the UK, the U.S. and Brazil, Coca-Cola Central Japan Co. starting in mid-November 2012, FedEx Express in Singapore, Saitama City, DHL Japan in Tokyo Metropolitan Area.

A more extensive 6-month trial with 28 units delivered to British Gas began in the UK in November 2013. The pre-production version of e-NV200 was unveiled at the 2013 Tokyo Motor Show.

The production version of the e-NV200 was unveiled at the 2014 Geneva Motor Show. The production version of the e-NV200 has 30% of new components compared with the internal combustion NV200. Production of Nissan e-NV200 began at Nissan's plant in Barcelona, Spain, by mid-2014.

Launched in June 2013, the car was scheduled to go on sale in Europe in the same month and in Japan in October. The e-NV200 was the top selling electric commercial van in Europe in 2016 with 4,319 units delivered. A tall-roof variant was launched in 2020 as the e-NV200 XL Voltia, increasing cargo volume by 90%.

The Nissan e-NV200 was expected to be available by 2017 for the NYC Taxi of Tomorrow fleet. However, structural changes would be required to bring the e-NV200 into compliance with US Federal Motor Vehicle Safety Standards, and the van never was released to the US market.

In 2021, Nissan unveiled the Townstar EV, which will replace the e-NV200. The Townstar EV is a rebadged Renault Kangoo E-Tech.

Specifications

As launched in 2014, the e-NV200 shared the same  /  AC synchronous traction motor unit with the second-generation Leaf; the traction motor had been integrated as a unit with the battery control module and inverter. Although the lithium-ion battery had the same number of modules (48) and capacity (24 kW-hr) as the Nissan Leaf, it was repackaged physically to fit under the load floor and within the wheelbase, where it forms part of the structural frame, boosting rigidity compared to the conventionally-powered NV200. The 24 kW-hr battery fitted to the e-NV up to the 2017 model year is capable of delivering an all-electric range of  under the New European Driving Cycle (NEDC). Cells are manufactured in the UK (at Sunderland) and shipped to Barcelona, where they are assembled. The standard on-board charger has a maximum input capacity of 3.3 kW (AC), doubling to 6.6 kW with an optional charger which also adds a CHAdeMO port that accepts up to 50 kW (DC).

In 2018, the battery capacity was increased by 67%, to 40 kWh, with a correspondingly extended driving range of  under the Japanese (JC08) driving cycle.

Compared to the conventional NV200, the e-NV200 is approximately  longer with revised styling that incorporates a charging port door in the center of the front end. The front suspension is identical to the Leaf, using MacPherson struts, and the rear suspension is taken from the conventional NV200, using leaf springs and a beam axle.

Nissan e-NV200 London Taxi/Dynamo Taxi
In 2019, a few months after the plug-in hybrid LEVC TX went on sale, the e-NV200 based Dynamo Taxi was launched by a firm also based in Coventry, UK. The Dynamo Taxi became the first 'black cab' on the streets of London to be fully electric since the Bersey Taxi in 1897 and is based on the Evalia version of the van.

In 2022, the Dynamo Motor Company had to phase out the Dynamo Taxi, after Nissan replaced the Nissan e-NV200 Evalia with the Renault Kangoo E-Tech-based Townstar EV, leaving the LEVC TX as the only electric taxi available to London cabbies.

Chevrolet City Express 
The Chevrolet City Express is a badge engineered Nissan NV200 for the American and Canadian markets marketed by Chevrolet. Chevrolet targeted the vehicle toward urban business owners as a cheaper and more compact option next to the full-sized Express van. The City Express came in two level trims (LS and LT), a fold-down passenger seat, 40/60-split rear cargo doors that open to 90- and 180-degree angles, left- and right-side sliding doors, twenty integrated cargo-mounting points throughout the interior, six floor-mounted D-rings and a center storage console. The LT trim included a 5.8-inch diagonal touch screen, navigation, Sirius XM Radio, and Bluetooth connectivity as part of their technology package. The latter was also available as an option for the LS trim.

The vehicle made its debut at the 2014 Chicago Auto Show and went on sale in the fall of 2014.

Chevrolet discontinued sales on the City Express in 2018, and informed dealers to immediately stop taking orders, citing disappointing sales and non-compatibility with GM parts.

Safety
The NV200 Combi received a three-star Euro NCAP score in May 2013. Euro NCAP commented of the adult occupant: "When the car was inspected after the frontal impact test, it was found that the floor panel had torn away from the base of the A pillar and numerous spot welds had released between the floor and sill...the main body of the sill was found to be bent inwards. The passenger compartment was judged to be unstable and the car was penalised. Similarly, the driver's footwell was found to have ruptured and was unstable and a further penalty was applied."

Awards
In April 2010, it was named the Professional Van and Light Truck Magazine International Van of the Year 2010.

The Nissan was announced as the winner of New York City's Taxi of Tomorrow, beating finalists Karsan V-1 and Ford Transit Connect. Nissan was awarded a 10-year contract to provide the city exclusively with some 13,000 yellow cabs, starting in 2013. The European version with the 1.5L Diesel four-cylinder gets 54.4 averaged mpg (44 miles per US gallon); however, the American version will obtain fewer miles per gallon.

Sales 
As of 30 August 2013, sales of Nissan NV200 reached 170,000 units.

References

External links

 Nissan NV200 Nissan UK
 Nissan NV200 Vanette 
 Nissan NV200 – Nissan Commercial Vehicles USA
 Chevrolet City Express official website
 Official Gonow Starry website in English

NV200
Vehicles introduced in 2009
2010s cars
2020s cars
Mini MPVs
Vans
Front-wheel-drive vehicles
All-wheel-drive vehicles
Electric vans
Taxi vehicles
Euro NCAP small MPVs